The 38. Aniversario de Arena México was a professional wrestling supercard show, scripted and produced by Consejo Mundial de Lucha Libre (CMLL), which featured the first ever CMLL International Gran Prix tournament. The event took place on April 15, 1994 and celebrated the 38th anniversary of the first show held in Arena México in April 1956, the arena that would become the main venue for CMLL and eventually be known as La Catedral de lucha libre ("The Cathedral of professional wrestling") and one of the most emblematic professional wrestling venues in the world. The International Gran Prix would become a regularly occurring tournament for CMLL in the years to follow.

Most of the matches on the show were dedicated to the first ever "International Gran Prix", a one night, 16-man single elimination tournament consisting of Mexican natives and a number of foreign wrestlers, some of which worked for CMLL on a regular basis (such as King Haku and Corazon de León) and others who were invited specially for the tournament (such as Yamato). The final match saw Rayo de Jalisco Jr. defeat King Haku to win the International Gran Prix.

Production

Background
In 1933 professional wrestling promoter Salvador Lutteroth held his first Lucha Libre show as Empresa Mexicana de Lucha Libre ("Mexican Wrestling Enterprise"; EMLL) at Arena Modelo. Lutteroth would later move EMLL to Arena Coliseo, but that venue turned out to be too small in the long run and Lutteroth funded the creation of Arena México on calle Doctor Lavista #203, Colonia Doctores. on the intersection of Dr.Rafael Lucio, Dr. Carmona and Valle. The building was completed in 1956 and is to this day the largest arena built specifically for professional wrestling. The arena opened in April, 1956 and ever since then EMLL has celebrated the Aniversario de Arena México in April of each year. In 1991 EMLL was renamed Consejo Mundial de Lucha Libre ("World Wrestling Enterprise"; CMLL), only three years after it became the oldest, still-active professional wrestling promotion in the world. The 2016 version of the Anniversary show will be the 60th show, making it the third longest annual professional wrestling show, after the CMLL Anniversary Shows that began in 1934 and the Arena Coliseo anniversary show that began in 1944.

Over the years the Aniversario de Arena México show has hosted significant headline matches including several Lucha de Apuestas, or bet matches, where the loser of the match was forced to unmask or have their hair shaved off. The first documented example of a Lucha de Apuesta match headlining a show was at the 12. Aniversario where Huracán Ramírez defeated El Enfermero, forcing him to unmask.

Storylines
The CMLL Gran Prix show  featured seventeen professional wrestling matches scripted by CMLL with some wrestlers involved in scripted feuds. The wrestlers portray either heels (referred to as rudos in Mexico, those that play the part of the "bad guys") or faces (técnicos in Mexico, the "good guy" characters) as they perform.

In early 1994, the Mexican  professional wrestling promotion Consejo Mundial de Lucha Libre (CMLL) announced their first ever International Gran Prix tournament. The tournament followed the standard "single elimination" format and featured sixteen wrestlers in total, eight representing Mexico and eight "international" wrestlers. Some of these international wrestlers were already working for CMLL at the time, such as King Haku and Corazon de León while others came to Mexico specifically for the tournament such as Japanese wrestler Yamato.

Tournament

Tournament overview

Tournament brackets

Aftermath
In 1995 CMLL brought the tournament back, creating an annual tournament held every year from 1995 through 1998 and then again in 2002, 2003 and finally from 2005 through 2008. The first five tournaments from 1994 through 1998 were all standard 16-man tournaments, but when CMLL brought the International Gran Prix tournament back in 2002 it was modified into a Torneo Cibernetico elimination match where an eight-man "Team Mexico" would face off against an eight-man "Team International" until only one team or wrestler survived.

Rayo de Jalisco Jr. won both the inaugural tournament as well as the 1998 International Gran Prix tournament, making him one of only two wrestlers to win the tournament twice. The other repeat winner was Último Guerrero, who won both the 2006 and 2007 International Gran Prixs. Headhunter A (1995) and Steel (1997) were the only "Team International" wrestlers to win a tournament prior to the 2008 International Gran Prix tournament. From 2009 through 2015 CMLL did not hold an International Gran Prix but they announced the return of the tournament in May 2016.

Tournament show

Footnotes

References

1994 in professional wrestling
CMLL Aniversario de Arena México
CMLL International Gran Prix